Heikant is a hamlet in the municipality of Someren, in the Dutch province of North Brabant. It is located about 3 km southwest of the centre of Someren.

References

Populated places in North Brabant
Someren